William Neale Lockington (1840 in Rugby, Warwickshire, England – 1902 in Worthing, Sussex) was an English zoologist.

California
Lockington was the curator of the  California Academy of Sciences museum in San Francisco, California from 1875 to 1881.

See also

:Category:Taxa named by William Neale Lockington

References

External links
 

English zoologists
1840 births
1902 deaths
American curators
People associated with the California Academy of Sciences
19th-century British zoologists